The 1964 Nashville 400 was a NASCAR Grand National Series event that was held on August 2, 1964, at Nashville Speedway (now Fairgrounds Speedway) in Nashville, Tennessee.

Background
Nashville Speedway was converted to a half-mile paved oval in 1957, when it began to be a NASCAR series track.

Race report
It took two hours, forty-three minutes, and fifty-five seconds for the race to reach its conclusion; Richard Petty was the winner of the race.

Notable crew chiefs for the race were Jimmy Helms, Dale Inman, Wendell Scott, and Herman Beam.

Three cautions were drawn for twenty-six laps in front of 13,128 people. This would be Bud Moore's first official NASCAR Cup Series race. Total winnings for this race were $9,380 in American dollars ($ when adjusted for inflation). Richard Petty would end up receiving the majority of the winnings with a grand total of $2,150 ($ when adjusted for inflation).

The transition to purpose-built racecars began in the early 1960s and occurred gradually over that decade.  Changes made to the sport by the late 1960s brought an end to the "strictly stock" vehicles of the 1950s.

Qualifying

Finishing order
Section reference:

 Richard Petty (No. 43)
 Jim Paschal† (No. 31)
 David Pearson† (No. 6)
 Earl Balmer (No. 5)
 Ned Jarrett (No. 11)
 Darel Dieringer† (No. 16)
 Larry Thomas† (No. 19)
 Jimmy Pardue† (No. 54)
 Doug Moore (No. 49)
 Neil Castles (No. 88)
 Bill McMahan (No. 42)
 Curtis Crider† (No. 02)
 Jack Anderson (No. 20)
 E.J. Trivette (No. 52)
 Junior Spencer* (No. 81)
 Wendell Scott*† (No. 34)
 Roy Tyner*† (No. 9)
 Bunkie Blackburn*† (No. 82)
 Billy Wade*† (No. 1)
 Henley Gray* (No. 81)
 Doug Cooper* (No. 60)
 Mark Hurley* (No. 32)
 Buddy Arrington* (No. 78)
 Rodney Bottinger* (No. 92)
 Chuck Huckabee* (No. 01)
 Steve Young* (No. 86)
 Bud Moore* (No. 66)

* Driver failed to finish race
† signifies that the driver is known to be deceased

References

Nashville 400
Nashville 400
NASCAR races at Fairgrounds Speedway